John Michael Orr (June 10, 1927 – December 30, 2013) was an American basketball player and coach, best known as the head coach of men's basketball at the University of Massachusetts Amherst, University of Michigan, and at Iowa State University. In the 1975–76 season, Orr was named National Coach of the Year.

Early life and playing career
Orr was born in Taylorville, Illinois or Yale, Kansas and grew up in Taylorville during the Great Depression. Orr attended Taylorville High School under coach Dolph Stanley and in his senior year (1944) led the Tornadoes to a state championship and a 45–0 record, the first team to ever finish a season undefeated in the Illinois High School Association's history. In 2007, Orr was voted one of the "100 Legends of the IHSA Boys Basketball Tournament," recognizing his superior performance in his appearance in the tournament. After high school Orr went to the University of Illinois and was the youngest freshman to compete in three sports. After joining the United States Navy for the end of World War II, Orr returned to the college game at Beloit College.  This reunited him with his high school coach Dolph Stanley, who had come to Beloit College as athletic director, head basketball and football coach.

Orr was initially drafted in 1948 BAA draft by the Minneapolis Lakers of the Basketball Association of America, the precursor to the NBA.  Orr did not play for the Lakers, and was again drafted the next year in the 2nd round by the St. Louis Bombers. In 1950, Orr played 21 games for the Bombers before moving to the Waterloo Hawks for 13 more games.

Coaching career
In 1951, Orr was named as head coach at Dubuque Senior High School in Dubuque, Iowa, holding the position until 1959. In 1959, Orr joined the collegiate ranks, becoming an assistant coach at Wisconsin.

UMass
Orr attained his first collegiate head coaching position in 1963 at UMass, where he guided the team to 15–9 record in 1963–64.

Michigan
After three seasons at UMass, Orr moved to the University of Michigan in 1967, serving as an assistant under head coach Dave Strack for one season.

In 1968 Orr was named head coach at Michigan, a position he would hold for 12 seasons. His 1973–74 team made it to the Elite Eight in the NCAA tournament and Orr was named Big Ten Coach of the Year. In 1976, Michigan was the NCAA tournament runner-up (to the undefeated Indiana Hoosiers) and Orr was named National Coach of the Year. His 209 wins were the most in Michigan history until John Beilein passed him in 2017.

Iowa State
Orr left Michigan to become the head coach of the Iowa State Cyclones in 1980, a program that had only one postseason appearance of any sort in school history, when it went to the Final Four in 1944.  Orr would go on lead the team to six NCAA Tournaments in 14 seasons. The surprise move to Iowa State in 1980 came about when the Iowa State athletic director called to inquire about Orr's assistant, Bill Frieder. When Orr learned how much Iowa State was willing to pay Frieder, Orr negotiated the job for himself. Iowa State initially paid Orr $45,000 annually compared to his $33,665 salary at Michigan. Frieder then would succeed Orr at Michigan.  In Orr's fourth season in Ames, Orr led the Cyclones to the 1984 NIT–only the second postseason appearance of any sort in school history. The following season, he led the Cyclones to their first NCAA Tournament berth in 40 years.  The following season, Orr's Cyclones reached the Sweet Sixteen of the 1986 NCAA Division I men's basketball tournament with a second round victory over the number five ranked team in the nation, Michigan.  Orr claims this was the greatest victory of his career. Orr led Iowa State to four more NCAA tournament berths before retiring from Iowa State in 1994.  He remains the winningest coach in Iowa State history with 218 wins.

Hilton Coliseum
Orr's Iowa State teams won 76.7% of their games at Hilton Coliseum. Under Orr, attendance numbers more than doubled from the 6,000 fan average that preceded his arrival. The school band would play the theme from The Tonight Show as Orr entered the arena floor before each game and Orr would give a fist pump to the Iowa State crowd. Orr coached Iowa State to 20 victories over teams ranked in the top 25 at Hilton, with writers coining the term “Hilton Magic.” 

Currently at Hilton Coliseum, Iowa State donors have access to "Johnny's", a sports bar themed space on the east side of Hilton Coliseum.  There are multiple flat-screen TVs as well as food served before the game and snacks served at halftime.  Alcoholic beverages are served at the bars.  A statue of Johnny Orr sits at the entrance along with cases full of memorabilia from his tenure at Iowa State.

Death
Orr died on December 30, 2013, at the age of 86 at Iowa Methodist Medical Center in Des Moines. Orr suffered from complications from a head injury from a fall at home.

Awards and honors

Taylorville High School Hall of Fame (athlete) 

1969 – Beloit College Hall of Fame (athlete) 

1973 – National Association of Intercollegiate Athletics (NAIA) Hall Of Fame (Athlete) 

1973 – Illinois Basketball Coaches Association Hall of Fame 

1973–1974 – Big Ten Coach of the Year

1975–1976 – National Association of Basketball Coaches (NABC) National Coach of the Year 

1992 – Dubuque Senior High School Hall of Fame  

2001 – Iowa State University Hall of Fame 

2004 – Des Moines Register Hall of Fame 

2011 – Statue erected in Hilton Coliseum

2011– University of Michigan Hall of Honor

Head coaching record

College

See also
 List of NCAA Division I Men's Final Four appearances by coach

References

1927 births
2013 deaths
American men's basketball players
Basketball coaches from Illinois
Basketball players from Illinois
Beloit Buccaneers men's basketball players
College men's basketball head coaches in the United States
High school basketball coaches in the United States
Illinois Fighting Illini football players
Illinois Fighting Illini men's basketball players
Iowa State Cyclones men's basketball coaches
Michigan Wolverines men's basketball coaches
Minneapolis Lakers draft picks
People from Taylorville, Illinois
People from Crawford County, Kansas
Small forwards
St. Louis Bombers (NBA) draft picks
St. Louis Bombers (NBA) players
UMass Minutemen basketball coaches
United States Navy personnel of World War II
Waterloo Hawks players
Wisconsin Badgers men's basketball coaches